The  Dongfeng -11 diesel locomotives (DF11)(Chinese:东风11), is a semi-high-speed diesel locomotive, from China Qishuyan Locomotive Works Manufacturing Co. used by the China Railway.

Overview 

China Railways DF11 Diesel-electric locomotive is a semi-high-speed passenger locomotive. It was an important scientific and technological objective of China's Eighth Five-Year Plan, and was designed for  runs on the Guangzhou-Shenzhen Railway. The new locomotive was then tested to obtain the experimental data for high-speed diesel service. In 1991, the  Ministry of Railways ordered the new locomotive based on the design plans developed by the Qishuyan plant. Code-named the DF11, the first DF11 number 0001 was completed in December 1992, with the test trials completed in August 1993. The next locomotive, No. 0002, reached the maximum speed of  during a test in the National Railway Test Centre (Eastern Suburbs Branch ) in April 1994. After the completion of the trials, the DF11 was formally placed into service on the Guangzhou-Shenzhen High Speed Railway Line in December. Production of the DF11 has stopped production as of 2005, Qishuyan factory produced 459 units total (license number 0001 ~ 0458, 1898), with DF11 1898 being named " The Zhou Enlai  "( the number is the same as  Zhou Enlai's year of birth ), belonging to Shanghai Railway Administration Shanghai Locomotive Depot.

The DF11 diesel locomotive is equipped with an AC-DC electric transmission, 16V280ZJA diesel engine, 1 three-phase AC synchronous alternator model JF204C, and 6 ZD106 DC traction motors. Maximum design speed of the Co-Co trucks is 170 km/h. The cab design incorporates a 25° inclination for streamlining. The locomotive microcomputer control system consists of constant power excitation control, cooling, anti-wheel slip transfer control, fault diagnosis display, with full power to test the resistance of dynamic braking system functions, and electro-pneumatic braking system.

In addition, the DF11 locomotives are designed for Xinjiang The Ürümqi Railway Bureau plateau type of configuration, mainly to increase the output of power, and installation of sound bilateral air intake / air filtration / filter sand unit, and to increase the gear ratio change from the 76:29 to 65:22, increasing starting traction and sustained traction. Currently, it serves the Guangzhou-Kowloon Through Train.

DF11 Model No. 3001
August 2000, DLoco trial was a quasi- high-speed lines of passenger diesel locomotives, numbered as No. DF11 3001. The locomotives and the Qishuyan Locomotive Works of the production easterly of 11 locomotives and no technical contact, based on Dongfeng 4D diesel engine car-based development is with Dalian Locomotive Plant Product Dongfeng 8B -type car No. 3001 (No. DF8B 3001, officially named Dongfeng 8D type) on the same platform developed passenger locomotive, officially named the  ' Dongfeng 11D type ' . Locomotive equipped with 12V280/320ZJ type (piston stroke ) medium-speed engine, diesel power is  loading. Maximum operating speed of locomotive .

Produced only one loco, and no amount of post- production. After an engine factory in the Jinan Locomotive Depot test application was mainly responsible for pulling the express train, but the process in the use of locomotive failures repeatedly. The locomotives were then sent back to Dalian Locomotive Works Archive, there are rumors that the locomotives have been scrapped and dismantled.

Major incidents 

On 28 April 2008, DF11 locomotive DF11-0400, hauling Train No. 5034, collided with the derailed Train No. T195 in the Jinan-Zibo section of the Jiaoji Railway. The DF11-0400 locomotive was declared destroyed beyond repair and later scrapped.

External links 
 locomotive description from builder (CSR)
 DF11 Profile on trainspo.com

DF11
Standard gauge locomotives of China
Railway locomotives introduced in 1992
Qishuyan locomotives
CRRC Dalian locomotives